Object theory can refer to 

The object of a metatheory.
The branch of metaphysics also known as abstract object theory.